Arthur Pole is the name of:

 Arthur Pole (courtier) (1499–1532), English knight
 Arthur Pole (conspirator) (1531–1570), nephew of the above

See also
Arthur Pohl (1900–1970) was a German screenwriter and film director
Arthur Poole (disambiguation)